The Big Tour (stylized THE BIG TOUR!) was the third concert tour by American recording artist, Chance the Rapper, in support of his debut album, The Big Day (2019). The tour began on September 20, 2019 in Las Vegas. The tour was cancelled in December 2019 after just five shows.

Background
On July 29, 2019, the rapper originally announced a 35-date tour starting in North America to promote his first album, The Big Day. However, on September 9, 2019, the rapper announced most tour dates would be postponed to spend more time with his family. Tickets bought for the original dates will be honored for the rescheduled dates. Festival appearances in Las Vegas & Miami Beach, and the first tour date in Chicago remained as scheduled. On September 25, 2019, Lil Yachty and Taylor Bennett were announced as the opening acts. The entire tour was cancelled on December 15, 2019.

Tour dates

Cancelled shows

Notes

References

2019 concert tours
Chance the Rapper